Dictyonellida is a brachiopod order within the Chileata, bearing a colleplax.

References

Brachiopod orders